Claude Maltret (October 3, 1621 – January 3, 1674) was a French Jesuit. 

Maltret was born at Puy in Savoy, Kingdom of France . He entered the Society of Jesus on October 12, 1637. Upon the completion of his studies, he was engaged for eleven years in teaching belles-lettres and rhetoric and became widely known as a classical scholar. He was then appointed to a professorship in Sacred Scripture, a position which he held for the next nine years. 

In 1662, he was made rector of the College of Montauban. In the following year, he brought out his greatest and best-known work, an edition of the histories of Procopius, with a critical commentary. This work went through many editions, being edited and augmented with notes by other scholars, and was included in the Synopsis Historiae Byzantinae, published at Venice. From 1672 to 1674 Father Maltret was rector of the novitiate of Toulouse, where he died.

Principal works

His principal works are the following:
 Procopii Caesariensis Historiarum Libri VIII.
 Procopii Caesariensis Arcana Historia. Qui est. fiber nonus Historiarum. This is an edition, with critical notes, of the Latin translation of Procopius, made by Nicolaus Alemannus. In the preface of this work Father Maltret promised a translation, with comments, of a Greek poem by Paulus Silentiarus entitled: "Descriptio Ecclesiae Santae Sophiae". This translation, however, was never published, and it is not known whether it was ever completed. 
 Procopii Caesariensis Historiarum sui temporis de bello Gothico libri quatuor.

Sources
 

1621 births
1674 deaths
17th-century French Jesuits